Buena Vista is an unincorporated community in White River Township, Randolph County, in the U.S. state of Indiana.

History
An old variant name of the community was called Cerro Gordo.

Geography

References

Unincorporated communities in Randolph County, Indiana
Unincorporated communities in Indiana